Mount Wild is a peak  west of Mount Augusta at the south-west extremity of the Queen Alexandra Range. It was discovered by the British Antarctic Expedition (1907–09) and named for Frank Wild, a member of the Southern Polar Party of that expedition.

References
 

Mountains of the Ross Dependency
Shackleton Coast